The Akademisches Gymnasium is a state gymnasium school located in Vienna, Austria. Founded by the Jesuits in March 1553, it is the oldest secondary school in Vienna and is now nondenominational and non-feepaying. The school offers a humanistic education and is known to be rather liberal compared to other traditional secondary schools in the city. Currently, there are approximately 600 pupils in 24 classes.

History

16th–18th century 

In the 16th century, it was the privilege of the University of Vienna to decide about the founding of educational institutions. In March 1553, the Jesuits were granted permission to found the Akademisches Gymnasium.

The main educational objectives of the exclusively Jesuit teachers was to instill knowledge and the practice of Catholicism in the pupils. At the time, the Akademisches Gymnasium was located opposite the university (today the Austrian Academy of Sciences) on the premises of today's Dominican monastery. Pupils were taught in Latin.

18th–20th century 

In 1773 Pope Clement XIV dissolved the Jesuit order so that both the teaching staff and the educational objectives of the Akademisches Gymnasium changed. The new focus was on History, Mathematics, German, Literature and Geography. The school was now run by the Piarists order.

It became more profane and the spirit of the Enlightenment was felt among teachers as well as pupils. New didactical and paedagogical methods were introduced, as were tuition fees.

As a result of the reform of secondary schools in 1849 the school was restructured to its present curriculum of 8 years ending with the Matura final exam. The humanistic aspects became more and more pronounced as education focused on languages, history, mathematics and the natural sciences. The first Matura exam was held in 1851.

In 1866 the school moved to its present building at Beethovenplatz in the 1st district of Vienna. It was built by Friedrich von Schmidt, the architect who also designed the Vienna townhall, in his typical neo-gothic style.

After the World Wars 

The period after World War I was very difficult for the Akademisches Gymnasium and it narrowly escaped closure because of a rapid decrease in the number of pupils. This development was temporarily reversed but in 1938 the school's fate was again in peril: with the Nazis coming to power in Austria, all the Jewish pupils and three teachers (one of them was David Ernst Oppenheim), had to leave the school thereby reducing the school's studentship by 40 percent. One of the most famous victims of these measures was Nobel laureate Walter Kohn.

After World War II, the Akademisches Gymnasium regained its old reputation. Known as one of the most demanding schools in Austria, it offers a general, humanistic education with a special focus on classical and modern languages preparing its pupils for further academic studies. Several of its teachers also teach at the University of Vienna. State-run, the school is free of charge and admission by merit. Nationwide examination for the Matura is only slowly being introduced in Austria since 2014/15; nevertheless, schools continue to examine their own pupils. Marks on non-centralised exams reflect the school's internal standards. The Akademisches Gymnasium has been performing Greek theatre on a semi-professional level, but is also known for excellent musical performances. Lately, the school's choir has won several competitions.

21st century 

There continues to be an emphasis on languages. Pupils have 8 years of either English or French, 6 years of Latin (5 years for intakes from 2011), and either 2 years of French or English (3 years from 2011) followed by 4 years of ancient Greek, or 6 years (7 years from 2011) of their second modern language. Italian, Spanish, Russian and Chinese are optional for the last three years.

Additionally, there are many intra- and extra-curricular projects and optional classes. The aim of the Akademisches Gymnasium is to give pupils a broad but solid general education, preparing them for study at university.

The school's main difficulty is lack of space. The landmark building cannot be enlarged, so there is not enough room to offer a place to all of the large number of applicants.

Notable alumni 

 Kurt Adler, chorus master and conductor (1943-1973) of the Metropolitan Opera New York City, New York (United States)
 Ludwig Adamovich Jr., President of the Austrian Constitutional Court
 Peter Altenberg, "Kaffeehaus writer"
 Richard Beer-Hofmann, writer
 Baron Max Wladimir von Beck, Minister-President of Austria
 Christian Broda, federal minister of justice
 Ignaz Franz Castelli (1781–1862), writer
 Thomas Chorherr, journalist, editor-in-chief of Die Presse
 Robert Danneberg, politician
 Paul Edwards, philosopher
 Paul Ehrenfest, physicist and mathematician
 Caspar Einem, federal minister of internal affairs and transport
 Paul Chaim Eisenberg, chief rabbi of Vienna
 Cajetan von Felder, mayor of Vienna
 Wolfgang Glück, film director
 Raimund Grübl, mayor of Vienna
 Karl Samuel Grünhut, jurist
 Paul Gulda, pianist
 Wilhelm Ritter von Haidinger (1795–1871), geologist
 Michael Hainisch, Federal President of Austria
 Martin Haselböck, organist
 Friedrich Heer, writer, historian
 Hugo von Hofmannsthal, playwright
 Karl Kautsky, philosopher, Marxist theoretician
 Hans Kelsen, constitutional lawyer, author of the Constitution of Austria
 Walter Kohn, physicist, Nobel laureate for chemistry in 1998
 Stanislaus Kostka (1550–1568), Catholic saint
 Joseph Kupelwieser (1791–1866), theatre director and libretist
 Leopold Kupelwieser (1796–1862), painter
 Markus Kupferblum, theatre and opera director
 Paul Lazarsfeld, sociologist
 Robert von Lieben, physicist
 Felix von Luschan, doctor, anthropologist, explorer, archaeologist and ethnographer
 Titu Maiorescu, Prime Minister of Romania
 Miki Malör, theatre and performance artist
 Paulus Manker, actor and film director
 Tomáš Garrigue Masaryk, founder and first President of Czechoslovakia
 Alexius Meinong, philosopher
 Lise Meitner, physicist
 Ludwig von Mises, economist
 Richard von Mises, mathematician, early member of the Vienna Circle
 Johann Nestroy, actor, playwright, poet
 Ignaz von Plener, politician, minister and Minister-President of Austria, Cisleithania
 Johann Nepomuk Prix, mayor of Vienna
 Doron Rabinovici, writer
 Joseph Othmar von Rauscher (1797–1875), archbishop of Vienna
 Elise Richter, philologist
 Erwin Ringel, physician, psychologist
 Arthur Schnitzler, playwright, physician
 Erwin Schrödinger, physicist, Nobel laureate for physics in 1933
 Franz Schubert (1797–1828), composer
 Johann Carl Smirsch (1793–1869), painter
 Eduard Strauss, composer
 Franz, Prince of Thun and Hohenstein, governor of Bohemia, Minister-President of Austria
 Milan Turković, bassoonist and conductor
 Oliver Vitouch, rector of the University of Klagenfurt and president of Universities Austria
 Otto Wagner, architect

See also 
 List of Jesuit educational institutions

References

Further reading 
 Akademisches Gymnasium. Wien 1, Beethovenplatz 1. In: Peter Haiko, Renata Kassal-Mikula: Friedrich von Schmidt. (1825–1891). Ein gotischer Rationalist (= Historisches Museum der Stadt Wien. Sonderausstellung 148). Museen der Stadt Wien, Wien 1991, S. 86–89.
 Felix Czeike: Historisches Lexikon Wien. Volume 2. Verlag Kremayr & Scheriau, Wien 1993, .
 Robert Winter: Das Akademische Gymnasium in Wien. Vergangenheit und Gegenwart. Böhlau, Wien 1996, .
 Festschrift zum 450. Jubiläum der Schulgründung, Akademisches Gymnasium Wien
 Year books

External links 

 Akademisches Gymnasium Wien
 

Schools in Vienna
Jesuit schools in Austria
Educational institutions established in the 1550s
Gymnasiums in Austria
1553 establishments in Austria
Establishments in the Archduchy of Austria